Anna Rezan (born Anna Hannah Rezan Kritseli, ; 12 December 1992) is a Greek actress and singer. She began her career in her early teens by appearing in Greek films and television series, most notably in the 2010 comedy film Show Bitch which premiered at the Thessaloniki International Film Festival.

Her first international feature film role was in La Commedia di Amos Poe, a new translation of Dante's Divine Comedy by Amos Poe that premiered in the 2010 Venice Film Festival and starred Roberto Benigni. Her debut song, "Let There Be Rain", was released internationally in 2011 and in 2016, "Let There be Love" was released internationally by Universal Music Group. In 2017, she co-starred in Dance Fight Love Die: With Mikis On the Road by Asteris Koutoulas. The film premiered at the Hof International Film Festival. Rezan's directorial debut, My People, is a historical documentary film, co-produced with Mitchell Block and Kim Magnusson. It premiered in 2022 in Los Angeles to positive reviews.

Early life 
She was born in Athens to Fotis Rezan Kritseli and Eva Matilda Kalamara, both of whom are interested in dramatic arts. Her father, who is of Izmirian, Cretan and Peloponnesian descent, is a federal judge who had aspirations to be a director; her mother, a Greek-Jewish attorney of Spanish and Polish descent, studied at Karolos Koun's School of Dramatic Arts before going to law school. Her maternal great-grandmother did not survived Auschwitz during World War II. Rezan has an older brother, Leon, is maternally related to Maria Rezan and paternally related to Constantine P Cavafy.Her father died in August 2007.

Rezan was interested in the arts from an early age and decided to be an actress after watching Greek movies, musicals, Disney films, and comedies. She started performing at age 11 in a school play and later performed with Stagecoach Productions. She began writing lyrics at age 9  and started electric guitar lessons at 17. At age 11, she starred in a theatrical show performing Oops!... I Did It Again while on summer holiday with her family. The following year, she starred in The Hall of Fame of the Moon, which premiered at the Greek National Opera and was produced by Cyprus' Ministry of Culture. Greece's Minister of Education attended the performance. She took classes at New York Film Academy and enrolled at Panteion University to study journalism in late 2009. She also took acting courses at Lee Strasberg Theatre and Film Institute in Los Angeles, where she lived part-time. As a teenager, her articles, which centered on love, therapy, films, and musicians such as David Bowie, Nick Cave, and The Cure, were published in indie magazines.

Career

Acting and directing 
In 2005, Rezan made her first appearance on Greek television in Η Νταντά, the Greek adaptation of The Nanny, and had minor parts in several TV series and films. She worked as a production runner on the set of The Sisterhood of the Traveling Pants; performed at the DJ set of Armin van Buuren in Cavo Paradiso in Mykonos; and represented Greece in the Miss European Union pageant in 2008. That year, she also appeared as Svetlana in the Greek comedy The Red Room, where she spoke Russian; starred in a TV adaption of Farewell Anatolia as Artemitsa; and performed in the rock opera The 300 Spartans on their world tour. She spent time in London in 2009 and moved briefly to New York City before resettling in Los Angeles. She continued working in Greece on projects such as the film Katharsi and as a guest star on Lola. She co-produced and co-starred in the romantic comedy Love at First Sight, a short film by Patricia di Salvo that was selected at the 2010 Cannes Film Festival. She also spent time in London modeling Couture fashion from Rira Sugawara for Vogue Italia and has walked in London Fashion Week.Discovered by Kithe Brewster she opened his show in 2014 during New York Fashion Week .

She starred as Hrysa, a teenage rock singer who turns into a rock star, in Nikos Zervo's Show Bitch in 2010. It premiered at the Thessaloniki International Film Festival. From there, she starred in a number of TV shows and films including Ever Been to the Moon?,
and appeared in magazines such as Cosmopolitan, Marie Claire and Esquire. In 2015, she filmed Dance Fight Love Die: With Mikis On the Road, a docu-fiction film by Asteris Koutoulas about composer Mikis Theodorakis. The film premiered at the Hof International Film Festival in 2017 and was released in theaters in 2018. Mikis Theodorakis and George Dalaras praised her performance. In 2016, she hosted the first annual Hellas Filmbox festival awards ceremony in Berlin, the city's first-ever Greek film festival. The following year, she portrayed supermodel Kate Mosscowitz in Victoria Larimore's Open House.

In 2019, Rezan began the production of Beauty Before Age, a British short comedy film that is set to be released in 2023.In 2022, she co-produced The Re Education Camp, a short documentary focusing on the Makronisos concentration camp used during the Greek Civil War and the Greek junta. My People, which she wrote, directed, produced, and narrated, is a feature-length documentary about Jews in Greece & the Greek Resistance movement during World War II. The film premiered in Los Angeles in 2022 at the Los Angeles Greek Film Festival.
In October 2022, it had its New York city premiere where it won the Audience Award for Best Film. The film had its Colorado premiere at the Vail Film Festival. On January 2023 the Order of AHEPA Bergen Knights Chapter #285 hosted the New Jersey Premiere of “My People,” to honor the Holocaust Remembrance Day as well as Rezan for promoting Hellenism across the world.

Music 
Rezan released her first song, "Let There Be Rain" from the film Show Bitch, in 2011 and co-produced the music video in Brooklyn, New York City. The track was produced at Equinox Studios in Luxembourg and aired for the first time in the United States on the CBS radio show Zodiac Divas in 2013. She covered the song "Happiness Is a Warm Gun" by the Beatles in a 2015 public service announcement directed by Amos Poe. In 2016, she signed with Minos EMI and Universal Music Group and released "Let There Be Love." "My Summer Night," a Latin pop ballad duet with Barbara Sassari, came out in 2017,  as did her cover of Mikis Theodorakis' "The Honeymoon Song" in the style of the Beatles. The music video was released ahead of the film Dance Fight Love Die: With Mikis On the Road. She also performed "Day in May" in German and "The Bells Will Ring" in Greek and English during the film. In 2020, she recorded a Greek version of "My Summer Night" called "San Nychta Kalokairini" and a week after she released a cover of the 1970s Greek folk song "Kapoios Giortazi" with Barbara Sassari.

Other interests and ventures 

In 2013, Rezan was a special guest at the fourth J'adore la mode Gala charity fashion show in Philadelphia benefitting the organization Evoluer House, which empowers young women through applicable skill-building programs. She has been a patron of Models Against Addiction, an organization dedicated to ending the stigma of addiction, since 2013. Also in 2013, she appeared in Constantinos Isaias' public service announcement "We Love Cyprus" and her 2015 cover of "Happiness Is a Warm Gun" was part of a PSA to raise awareness about breast cancer. In 2020, she was a guest lecturer at the Athens School of Fine Arts to discuss "Beauty... shall reunite with Art" and to the Henry Reeve Brigade at the Cuban Embassy in Athens to support their initiative to nominate Cuban doctors of Cuban medical internationalism for a Nobel Peace Prize. In November 2022 Rezan was the head of Jury committee for the "Bridges" Peloponnese International Film Festival that was held in Loutraki, Greece.

Personal life 
Rezan is largely private about her personal life but has made a concerted effort to be open about her struggles with depression, panic attacks, and anxiety and her recovery journey. She has spoken about different types of therapy and self-healing in the hope that it would inspire others to seek help. She is also a reiki therapist. In 2011, she shared her life mottos: "love brings love" and "love is the greatest power of all as the youngest member of the board of MMA Foundation in NYC " She also supports World Wildlife Foundation, and Action Aid and is the founder of the Love Brings Love organization.

Tabloids have been interested in Rezan's romantic life since her teenage years when she dated Panos Mouzourakis. In 2009, she was thought to have dated The Durrells actor Alexis Georgoulis; in 2010, her Show Bitch co-star Nassos Papargyropoulos; and in 2011, Panagiotis Bougiouris. In 2014, she denied rumors that she and Alexander Payne had a romantic relationship. but she stated that he is a friend that she admires.

Filmography

Film

TV series

Stage

Discography

References

External links 
 
 

Living people
Actresses from Athens
1992 births
Greek film actresses
Greek television actresses
American film actresses
Greek Jews
Musicians from Athens
Film people from Athens
21st-century American women
21st-century Greek actresses
21st-century Greek women singers
European Ashkenazi Jews